The mixed team compound archery competition at the 2022 World Games took place from 8 to 9 July 2022 at the Avondale Park Historic District in Birmingham, United States.

Results

Qualification round

Elimination round

References 

Mixed team compound